Glutathione S-transferase A2 is an enzyme that in humans is encoded by the GSTA2 gene.

Cytosolic and membrane-bound forms of glutathione S-transferase are encoded by two distinct supergene families. These enzymes function in the detoxification of electrophilic compounds, including carcinogens, therapeutic drugs, environmental toxins and products of oxidative stress, by conjugation with glutathione. The genes encoding these enzymes are known to be highly polymorphic. These genetic variations can change an individual's susceptibility to carcinogens and toxins as well as affect the toxicity and efficacy of some drugs. At present, eight distinct classes of the soluble cytoplasmic mammalian glutathione S-transferases have been identified: alpha, kappa, mu, omega, pi, sigma, theta and zeta. This gene encodes a glutathione S-transferase belonging to the alpha class. The alpha class genes, located in a cluster mapped to chromosome 6, are the most abundantly expressed glutathione S-transferases in liver. In addition to metabolizing bilirubin and certain anti-cancer drugs in the liver, the alpha class of these enzymes exhibit glutathione peroxidase activity thereby protecting the cells from reactive oxygen species and the products of peroxidation.

References

Further reading